Chaetopleuridae is a family of chitons. They are marine molluscs.

Genera
Two genera are known in this family:
 Chaetopleura  Shuttleworth, 1853
 Dinoplax Carpenter MS, Dall, 1882

References

External links

 
Chiton families